The magazine Strategische Unternehmensführung (English: Strategic Management or Strategic Leadership) was established in 1998. It was published semi-annual in Munich and St. Gallen. It featured articles on strategic leadership and management through the eyes of economic science, business research, and business practice. The editor-in-chief was Martin H. Wiggers. The magazine was published by the Andechser Studienkreis. Up from the second issue the magazine was printed on yellow paper. So the slogan became “Knowledge Is Yellow”. The last issue was published in 2003.

Content 
The magazine Strategische Unternehmensführung featured articles on Strategic Leadership and Management. They took a critical look beside the mainstream by the view of business science, business research, and business practice. The topics were for example:
 Balanced Scorecard
 The Error Of The 'Faster, Cheaper Better' (German: Der Irrtum des 'Faster Cheaper Better')
 Economic Globalization (German: Globalisierung)
 Shareholder Value

Authors and readers 
The magazine's writers were for example:
 Werner Kirsch
 Michael Mirow
 George W. Stroke
 Martin H. Wiggers

The magazine was read from business executives, the board of directors of companies listed in the DAX, politicians of the Bavarian Government, and many others.

References

External links 
 

1998 establishments in Germany
2003 disestablishments in Germany
Biannual magazines published in Germany
Defunct magazines published in Germany
Business and management journals
Business magazines published in Germany
German economics journals
German-language magazines
Magazines established in 1998
Magazines disestablished in 2003
Magazines published in Munich
Higher School of Economics academic journals
Professional and trade magazines